Alain Colombo (born April 5, 1961) is a former professional footballer. He played as a centre-half and played for Metz in the Coupe de France Final 1984.

External links
Alain Colombo profile at chamoisfc79.fr

1961 births
Living people
French footballers
Association football defenders
FC Metz players
Chamois Niortais F.C. players
FC Gueugnon players
Ligue 1 players
Ligue 2 players